Klaus-Peter is a given name. Notable people with the name include:

Klaus-Peter Ebeling (born 1944), East German sprint canoeist
Klaus Peter Foppke, German rower
Klaus-Peter Göpfert (born 1948), German former wrestler
Klaus-Peter Hanisch (1952–2009), German footballer
Klaus-Peter Hennig (born 1947), former discus thrower
Klaus-Peter Hildenbrand (born 1952), West German athlete who competed in the 5000 metres
Klaus-Peter Justus (born 1951), East German middle-distance runner
Klaus-Peter Kerkemeier (born 1951), German football midfielder
Klaus-Peter Lesch, German clinical psychiatrist 
Klaus-Peter Müller (born 1944), German banker
Klaus-Peter Sabotta, extortionist who sabotaged German railways in December 1998
Klaus-Peter Schneider (born 1964), retired German javelin thrower
Klaus-Peter Siegloch (born 1946), German journalist
Klaus-Peter Thaler (born 1949), German professional cyclist between 1976 and 1988
Klaus-Peter Willsch (born 1961), German politician (CDU)

German masculine given names